Machiliwale Shah (died 8 September 1932), also known as Syed Kamalullah Shah, was an Indian Muslim Sufi, saint and scholar of the Quadri, Chisti order from India. He was the disciple and the spiritual successor of Syed Sultan Mahmoodullah Shah Hussaini (Shaji). One of his disciples and spiritual successors was Ghousi Shah and Mohammad Hussain(Nazim e Wanaparthy), who became the spiritual master of India's noted Sufi saint.

Biography
Syed Kamalullah Shah was popularly known as Machiliwale Shah. He explained mysteries of life and existence to educated professors and scholars. His residence Ilahi Chaman (Nimboliadda, Kachiguda) became the centre of Ulemas and Sufis. Professors, poets, jurists and bureaucrats would pride themselves, sitting at the feet of Machiliwale Shah. He stressed inner illumination and the value of a pure and simple life.

Spiritual history
Kamalullah Shah (Machiliwale Shah), a businessman from Mysore, surrendered to Syed Mahmoodullah Shah Hussaini when he first met him in Secunderabad. He was initiated (mureed) in the Sufi order and later became the saint's successor (janasheen). When Ghousi Shah came to his khankha, he took him into baiyat and was awarded khilafath instantly. He was later made janasheen by Syed Mahmoodullah Shah Hussaini.

Visitors
Personalities who visited the saint for acquiring knowledge of tasawwuf (Sufism) include:
Maharaja Kishan Parshad (Prime Minister of Hyd)
Sir Akbar Hyder Yar Jung
Nawab Mehdi Yar Jung
Sir Nizamuth Jung
Samad Yar Jung, Nawab Sayeed Jung
Moulana Anwarullah Khan, honorifically known as Fazeelath Jung (founder of Jamia Nizamia)
Moulana Barkath Ahmed Tonki (famous Aalim-E-Deen)
Moulana Manazir Ahsan Gilani, Professor ilias Burni.

Titles
 Sirajus Salikeen
 Shaikus Shuyoq
 Shamsul Aarefin

Khulafa
 Moulana Shah Syed Hussain
 Moulana Shah Mohammad Hussain Nazim (Judge) Vanaparthy
 Ghousi Shah
 Moulana Meer Ahmed Hussain Bilyamin
 Syed Barkath Ahmed Tonky
 Moulana Syed Obaidullah Alhussaini
 Moulana Zainul Abedeen

Death

He died on 8 September 1932. His tomb is situated at Elahi Chaman, besides Masjid-E-Elahi, Kachiguda in Hyderabad.

Urs
His annual Urs is organized by his successor Moulana Ghousavi Shah on 29th Rabi-us-sani every year. Moulana Ghousavi Shah and other religious scholars preside over the function every year. The Urs celebrations end with sama (Qawwali Programme) at Baith-Un-Noor, Hyderabad.

Related
 Mahmoodullah Shah
 Kareemullah Shah
 Ghousi Shah
 Moulana Sahvi Shah
 Alhaj Moulana Ghousavi Shah

Gallery

References

1932 deaths
Chishti Order
Indian Muslim scholars of Islam
Indian Sufis
Scholars of Sufism
Year of birth missing
Writers from Hyderabad, India
Indian Sufi saints